Yekaterina Sergeyevna Likhachyova (born 24 August 1998) is a Russian ice hockey player and member of the Russian national ice hockey team, currently playing in the Zhenskaya Hockey League (ZhHL) with SKIF Nizhny Novgorod. 

Likhachyova participated in the women's ice hockey tournament at the 2018 Winter Olympics with the Olympic Athletes from Russia women's ice hockey team and represented the Russian Olympic Committee (ROC) at the 2021 IIHF Women's World Championship.

References

External links
 
 
 

1998 births
Living people
Ice hockey players at the 2018 Winter Olympics
Russian women's ice hockey forwards
Olympic ice hockey players of Russia
People from Kirovo-Chepetsk
HC SKIF players
Sportspeople from Kirov Oblast